"Sweet Thing" is a 1993 song recorded by English singer-songwriter Mick Jagger who also wrote it. It was the first single from his album Wandering Spirit and was released in January 1993. It was a top-ten hit in Austria, France, Norway and Switzerland. In the United States, it peaked at number 84 on the Billboard Hot 100.

Formats and track listings
These are the formats and track listings of major single releases of "Sweet Thing":

 CD single - US, 7" single - Germany
 "Sweet Thing" — 4:21  	
 "Wandering Spirit" — 4:17

 CD maxi - US
 "Sweet Thing" (Mick's extended version) — 6:54
 "Sweet Thing" (Mick's dub) — 4:57
 "Sweet Thing" (extended remix) — 6:01
 "Sweet Thing" (stripped down version) — 4:38
 "Sweet Thing" (instrumental of stripped down version) — 4:39
 "Sweet Thing" (LP mix) — 4:18

 CD maxi - US
 "Sweet Thing" (Mick's extended version) — 6:54
 "Sweet Thing" (Mick's dub) — 4:55
 "Sweet Thing" (instrumental of extended sax) — 4:49
 "Sweet Thing" (extended remix) — 5:59
 "Sweet Thing" (stripped down version) — 4:37
 "Sweet Thing" (instrumental of stripped down version) — 4:37

 CD maxi - Europe, US
 "Sweet Thing" (LP version) — 4:21
 "Sweet Thing" (Mick's mix) — 6:44
 "Sweet Thing" (dub) — 6:44
 "Wandering Spirit" — 4:17

 12" maxi - Germany
 "Sweet Thing" (Mick's mix) — 6:44
 "Sweet Thing" (dub) — 6:44
 "Sweet Thing" (LP version) — 4:21
 "Wandering Spirit" — 4:17

 12" maxi - Germany
 "Sweet Thing" (extended remix) — 5:59
 "Sweet Thing" (stripped down version) — 4:37
 "Sweet Thing" (stripped down instrumenral) — 4:37
 "Sweet Thing" (remix edit) — 4:20
 "Sweet Thing" (funky guitar edit) — 4:20
 "Sweet Thing" (extended sax instrumental) — 4:49

Credits
 Original sound recording made by Promotone BV
 All remixes by Mick Jagger
 Produced by Mick Jagger and Rick Rubin
 Design by Richard Bates

Charts

Weekly charts

Year-end charts

References

1992 songs
1993 singles
Mick Jagger songs
Song recordings produced by Rick Rubin
Songs written by Mick Jagger